Apradhi is a 1992 Indian Bollywood drama film directed by K. Ravi Shankar and produced by N.R. Pachisia. It stars Anil Kapoor, Shilpa Shirodkar, Anupam Kher and Vijayashanti in pivotal roles.

Plot 
Satyaprakash, an honest security personnel is suddenly killed, One unknown young man Shiva comes to save the family of Satyaprakash.

Cast
 Anil Kapoor as Shiva
 Vijayashanti as Paro
 Chunky Pandey as Salim / Ravi
 Shilpa Shirodkar as Kamini
 Anupam Kher as Heera
 Raza Murad as Balwant
 Suresh Oberoi as Satyaprakash
 Arun Bakshi as Police Inspector
 A. K. Hangal as Bishambharnath
 Urmila Bhatt as Mrs. Bishambharnath
 Subbiraj as Dhanraj
 Aparajita as Parvati
 Aasif Sheikh as Chander
 Jack Gaud as Shakura
 Goga Kapoor as Damodar
 Pradeep Rawat as Teju
 Dan Dhanoa as Badshah
 Krishan Dhawan as Badshah's Friend
 Yunus Parvez as Banwari
 Vijayendra Ghatge in Special Appearance

Soundtrack

Music was composed by Laxmikant–Pyarelal and lyrics were written by Anand Bakshi.

References

External links

1990s Hindi-language films
1992 films
Films scored by Laxmikant–Pyarelal
Indian drama films